Round Lake is a  body of water located  southwest of Sagle in Bonner County, Idaho. It is the prime feature of Round Lake State Park and has  of shoreline. The lakeshore and watershed are heavily forested and undeveloped. The shoreline is undeveloped except for the public swimming beach at the state park.

Round Lake is eutrophic; its primary water source is Cocolalla Lake via Cocolalla Creek. The outflow is via the continuation of Cocolalla Creek. Most of the lake bottom is silt and detritus. Shore areas with a sandy bottom include the state park swimming beach.

References

External links
Round Lake Idaho Department of Fish and Game

Lakes of Idaho
Lakes of Bonner County, Idaho